The 1938 Railway Cup Hurling Championship was the 12th series of the Railway Cup, an annual hurling championship organised by the Gaelic Athletic Association. The championship took place between 20 February and 17 March 1938. It was contested by Connacht, Leinster and Munster.

Munster entered the championship as the defending champions.

On 17 March 1938, Munster won the Railway Cup after a 6-02 to 4-03 defeat of Leinster in the final at Croke Park, Dublin. It was their 8th Railway Cup title overall and their second in succession.

Leinster's Mick Daniels was the Railway Cup's top scorer with 3-01.

Results

Semi-finals

Final

Top scorers

Overall

Single game

Sources

 Donegan, Des, The Complete Handbook of Gaelic Games (DBA Publications Limited, 2005).

External links
 Munster Railway Cup-winning teams

Railway Cup Hurling Championship
Railway Cup Hurling Championship